A Son Comes Home is a 1936 American drama film directed by E.A. Dupont and starring Mary Boland, Julie Haydon and Donald Woods. It was one of three films made by Dupont for Paramount Pictures.

Plot

Partial cast
 Mary Boland as Mary Grady
 Julie Haydon as Jo
 Donald Woods as Denny
 Wallace Ford as Steve
 Roger Imhof as Detective Kennedy
 Anthony Nace as Brennan
 Gertrude W. Hoffman as Effie Wimple
 Eleanor Wesselhoeft as Essie Wimple
 Charles Middleton as Prosecutor
 Thomas E. Jackson as District Attorney
 John Wray as Gas Station Owner
 Robert Middlemass as Sheriff
 Lee Kohlmar as Proprietor
 Herbert Rawlinson as Bladeu
 George Hassell as Captain

References

Bibliography
 St. Pierre, Paul Matthew. E.A. Dupont and His Contribution to British Film. Fairleigh Dickinson University Press, 2010 .

External links 
 
 
 dvd availability A Son Comes Home

1936 films
American drama films
American black-and-white films
1936 drama films
Films directed by E. A. Dupont
Films scored by John Leipold
Paramount Pictures films
1930s English-language films
1930s American films